Ann McKenna (born 27 October 1943) is a New Zealand former cricketer and field hockey player. She first represented New Zealand at hockey, doing so twice in 1967 and 1971. In cricket, she played in seven Test matches and fourteen One Day Internationals for New Zealand between 1969 and 1987. She played domestic cricket for Canterbury.

She played club cricket for St Albans, making a club record partnership of 242* with Vicki Burtt, with McKenna making 88* and Burtt making 148*. In 2005, she held the St Albans record for most appearances for the club, at 330.

References

External links
 
 

1943 births
Living people
Cricketers from Christchurch
New Zealand women cricketers
New Zealand women Test cricketers
New Zealand women One Day International cricketers
Canterbury Magicians cricketers
New Zealand cricket coaches
Female cricket coaches